The League of Historical Cities (LHC) was established in Kyoto, Japan in 1987. It holds a biennial world conference and provides cities from different cultures with a platform for bilateral cooperation and mutual learning. The League also acts as a think tank for bilateral cooperation and best practices. It aims to strengthen affiliations between historic cities to exchange knowledge and experience and ultimately world peace by deepening mutual understanding and building on the common foundation of historical cities to strengthen affiliations between cities.

As of December 2014, the league is composed of 119 members from 66 countries and regions. It is in partnership with the United Nations Human Settlements Programme, International Council on Monuments and Sites and the Organization of World Heritage Cities.

World Conference of Historical Cities 
The league holds a biennial world conference.
 Kyoto 1987 "Historical Cities in the 21st Century – Tradition and Creativity -"
 Florence 1988 "Historical Cities in the Future of Mankind"
 Barcelona 1991 "The Memories of and Futures of Cities"
 Kyoto 1994 "In Quest of the Wisdom of Historical Cities"
 Xi'an 1996 "Revival of Historical Cities"
 Kraków 1998 "Heritage and Development of Historical Cities"
 Montpellier 2000 "History of Value"
 Montreal 2003 "Conserving and Developing – How? With whom? Why? –"
 Gyeongju 2005 "Today and Tomorrow of the Historical Cities: Preservation and Restoration of the Historical Cities"
 Ballarat 2006 "Sustainable Historical Cities: – Economics, Preservation and Visions for the Future –"
 Konya 2008 "Living Cultural Heritage in Historical Cities"
 Nara 2010 "Succession of Historical City with Creative Revitalization"
 Huế 2012 "Defining Universal Heritage Challenges and Solutions"
 Yangzhou 2014 "Historical Cities: Ancient Culture Integrated into Modern Civilization"
 Bad Ischl 2016 "Smart, innovative, creative historical cities of the future"
 Bursa 2018 "The Impact of Globalization on Culture and Way of Living"

Member cities

Africa 

 Accra
 Alexandria
 Algiers
 Fez
 Giza
 Luxor
 Tunis

Asia 

 Andong
 Buyeo County
 Chengdu
 Chiang Mai
 Dujiangyan
 Gongju
 Gyeongju
 Hanoi
 Huế
 Kaesong
 Kamakura
 Kanazawa
 Kathmandu
 Kurunegala
 Kyoto
 Lahore
 Naha
 Nanjing
 Nara
 Suwon
 Taichung
 Tainan
 Ulan Bator
 Varanasi
 Vigan
 Wuxi
 Xi'an
 Yangon
 Yangzhou
 Yogyakarta
 Zhengzhou

Europe 

 Alba Iulia
 Amsterdam
 Athens
 Bad Ischl
 Barcelona
 Bordeaux
 Bratislava
 Brussels
 Budapest
 Chernivtsi
 Cologne
 Constanța
 Córdoba
 Cracow
 Dijon
 Dublin
 Edinburgh
 Florence
 Geneva
 The Hague
 Helsingborg
 Iași
 Kazan
 Kyiv
 Klaipeda
 Kutaisi
 Lisbon
 Ljubljana
 Lutsk
 Lviv
 Minsk
 Montpellier
 Mtskheta
 Nicosia
 Niš
 Norwich
 Odessa
 Paris
 Prague
 Riga
 Rome
 Santiago de Compostela
 Sarajevo
 Shaki
 South East Region of Malta
 Strasbourg
 Tashkent
 Termez
 Veliko Tarnovo
 Venice
 Vienna
 Zagreb

Latin America 

 Cartagena
 Cuenca
 Cusco
 Guadalajara
 Mexico City

Middle East 

 Ankara
 Baghdad
 Bursa
 Hebron
 Isfahan
 Istanbul
 Jerusalem
 Kashan
 Kong
 Konya
 Luxor
 Nishapur
 Osmangazi
 Şanlıurfa
 Semnan
 Shiraz
 Tabriz
 Yazd

North America 

 Boston
 Montreal
 Quebec City

Pacific 

 Ballarat
 City of Melbourne
 City of Norwood Payneham & St Peters
 Whanganui

References

External links 
 The League of Historical Cities

Heritage organizations
Municipal international relations
History organizations based in Japan